Waza Logone floodplain is a semi-arid ecosystem in northern Cameroon. Covering , the floodplain is located in the Far North Region. Nigeria is to the west while Chad is to the east.
The area was designated a "Wetland of International Importance" under the Ramsar Convention on March 20, 2006.

See also
Waza National Park

References

Floodplains of Africa
Ramsar sites in Cameroon